Graz Airport , known as Flughafen Graz in German, is a primary international airport serving southern Austria.

Location
Graz Airport spans the village Abtissendorf in Feldkirchen municipality and the cadastral community Thalerhof in Kalsdorf municipality. The airport terminal is located in Abtissendorf.

History

Early years
Construction of the airport began in 1913 with the construction of a grass runway and the first hangars; the airport saw its first flight in 1914. It was the site of Thalerhof internment camp, run by the governments of Franz Joseph I of Austria and Charles I of Austria. The first domestic passenger flight in Austria in 1925 serviced the route Vienna–Graz–Klagenfurt. In 1930 Yugoslav flag carrier Aeroput started regular flights linking Yugoslav capital Belgrade with Vienna with stops in Zagreb and Graz. In 1937, construction of a terminal building began due to increase in the number of passengers.

After the end of the Second World War, Austria was forbidden to possess either a military or civilian aviation fleet. The route network grew quickly and the first international scheduled flight started in 1966 with flights to Frankfurt.

Highlights were visits by Concorde in 1981 and by a Boeing 747 on the occasion of the airport's 70th anniversary in 1984. Ten years later, another new building was constructed with a maximum annual capacity of 750,000 passengers.

Development in the 2000s
In early 21st century, the number of passengers exceeded the 750,000 mark and in 2004 was just below 900,000. This led to the final extension of the current terminal building in 2003 and the construction of a second terminal in 2005.

In summer 2015, the airport received two new routes to European hubs: Swiss International Air Lines to Zurich and Turkish Airlines to Istanbul Atatürk Airport. Though Turkish Airlines discontinued their services to Istanbul in the wake of the COVID-19 pandemic, Swiss International Air Lines announced to increase the frequency on their route from their hub in Zürich to Graz in summer 2023.

In December 2022, Eurowings announced that it will establish an additional base at Graz Airport, starting in 2023. This major commitment to Graz features nine new routes, with two of them linking Graz to Berlin and Hamburg and the other ones being leisure routes. Furthermore, the overall frequencies of already existing services to Düsseldorf, Stuttgart and Palma de Mallorca will be enhanced.

Facilities
The passenger terminal building features shops, travel agencies, a restaurant and cafés, conference facilities, a bank, car rental and service counters. The apron provides stands for aircraft up to the size of a Boeing 747 or An-124. There are no jet bridges, mobile stairways are used for boarding. The airport offers one VIP lounge for business class customers or customers with priority status, which is operated by the airport.

While there are no scheduled cargo flights to the airport, charter flights are regularly conducted, especially for time-critical cargo like automotive parts.

Airlines and destinations
The following airlines offer regular scheduled, seasonal, and charter flights at Graz Airport:

Statistics

Access

Public transport
A bus stop can be found next to the arrival area. Regional bus line 630 operates service to Graz, the transfer to central Graz takes 20 minutes. The airport is within walking distance (approximately 420 metres, seven minutes on foot) of the Graz Airport Railway Station (Flughafen Graz-Feldkirchen Bahnhof). Line S5 (Graz to Spielfeld-Straß) connects the airport to Graz. The journey from the Graz Airport Railway Station to the Graz Central Station takes eleven minutes.

Car
Graz Airport is accessible via motorways A9 (exit Kalsdorf) and A2 (exit Flughafen Graz/Feldkirchen).

See also
 Transport in Austria
 List of airports in Austria

References

External links

 Official website
 Styrian Public Transport Association, route planner for public transport on the ground
 
 

Airports in Austria
Airports established in 1914
Airport
Buildings and structures in Styria
1914 establishments in Austria-Hungary
International airports in Austria